Rumbula Station is a railway station on the Riga – Daugavpils Railway in Latvia.

References

Railway stations in Riga
Railway stations opened in 1921